Crow's Nest is a small community in the Canadian province of Nova Scotia, located in the Municipality of the District of Saint Mary's in Guysborough County.

There is a local fishing camp there that goes by the same name. It is run as a social club with ten members.

References
Crow's Nest on Destination Nova Scotia

Communities in Guysborough County, Nova Scotia
General Service Areas in Nova Scotia